Shady Lady may refer to:
Shady Lady (1945 film)
Shady Lady (aircraft), B-24 Liberator aircraft
Shady Lady, a 2012 film about the aircraft Shady Lady
Shady Lady Ranch, a brothel in Nevada
Shady Lady, a boat design by Phil Bolger
 Shady Lady, a 1933 musical by Jesse Greer and Sam H. Stept

Music
"Shady Lady" (Gene Pitney song), a 1970 song
"Shady Lady" (Ani Lorak song), a 2008 song
"Shady Lady", a 1975 song by Uriah Heep from Return to Fantasy
"Shady Lady", a 1979 song by Status Quo from Whatever You Want
"Shady Lady", a 1971 song by Quincy Jones from Dollar$
"Shady Lady", a 2014 song by B.A.P. from First Sensibility